|-
| Deševa
| 
| 
|-
| Djevor
| 
| 
|-
| Dobrič 
| Široki Brijeg
|
|-
|Dobričevići
|
|
|-
|Dobrići 
|Tomislavgrad
|
|-
|Dobrigošće
|
|
|-
| Dobrinja 
| Jablanica
| Herzegovina-Neretva Canton
|-
|Dobrkovići 
|Široki Brijeg
|
|-
|Dobro Selo
| Čitluk
|
|-
|Dobro 
|Livno
| Canton 10
|-
|Doci 
|Široki Brijeg
|
|-
|Dolac 
|Glamoč
| Canton 10
|-
|Dole
| Ljubuški
|
|-
|Dolovi
| Konjic
| Herzegovina-Neretva Canton
|-
|Doljani
| Čapljina
| Herzegovina-Neretva Canton
|-
|Doljani
| Konjic
| Herzegovina-Neretva Canton
|-
|Doljani
| Jablanica
| Herzegovina-Neretva Canton
|-
|Domanovići
|
|
|-
|Donja Blatnica
|
|
|-
|Donji Boganovci
|
|
|-
|Donja Brda
|
|
|-
|Donja Britvica 
|Široki Brijeg
|
|-
|Donja Bukvica
|
|
|-
|Donja Jablanica
|
|
|-
|Donja Vratna Gora
|
|
|-
|Donje Paprasko
|
|
|-
|Donje Peulje 
|Bosansko Grahovo
| Canton 10
|-
|Donje Ravno 
|Kupres
| Canton 10
|-
|Donje Selo
| Goražde
| Bosnian Podrinje Canton
|-
|Donje Selo
| Konjic
| Herzegovina-Neretva Canton
|-
|Donje Višnjevice
|
|
|-
|Donje Vukovsko 
|Kupres
| Canton 10
|-
|Donje Žešće
|
|
|-
|Donji Bogovići
|
|
|-
|Donji Brišnik 
|Tomislavgrad
| Canton 10
|-
|Donji Crnač 
|Široki Brijeg
|
|-
|Donji Čažanj
|
|
|-
|Donji Gradac
| Konjic
| Herzegovina-Neretva Canton
|-
|Donji Gradac 
|Široki Brijeg
|
|-
|Donji Kazanci 
|Bosansko Grahovo
| Canton 10
|-
|Donji Malovan 
|Kupres
| Canton 10
|-
|Donji Mamići
|
|
|-
|Donji Nevizdraci
|
|
|-
|Donji Prijeslop
|
|
|-
|Donji Rujani 
|Livno
| Canton 10
|-
|Donji Tiškovac 
|Bosansko Grahovo
| Canton 10
|-
|Donji Vakuf
|
|
|-
|Došćica
|
|
|-
| Dračevo
| Čapljina
| Herzegovina-Neretva Canton
|-
| Dragan Selo
| 
| 
|-
| Dragičina
| 
| 
|-
| Dragnjić 
| Glamoč
| Canton 10
|-
| Dragolji
| 
| 
|-
| Dragovići
| Goražde
| Bosnian Podrinje Canton
|-
| Dretelj
| 
| 
|-
| Drinova Međa 
| Livno
| Canton 10
|-
| Drinovačko Brdo
| 
| 
|-
| Drinovci
| 
| 
|-
| Drvar 
| Drvar
| Canton 10
|-
| Drvar (selo) 
| Drvar
| Canton 10
|-
| Drvetine
| 
| 
|-
| Držanlije 
| Livno
| Canton 10
|-
| Dubočani
| Konjic
| Herzegovina-Neretva Canton
|-
| Duboko Mokro 
| Široki Brijeg
| 
|-
| Dubrave 
| Glamoč
| Canton 10
|-
| Dubravica
| Čapljina
| Herzegovina-Neretva Canton
|-
| Dubravice
| Konjic
| Herzegovina-Neretva Canton
|-
| Dučići
| 
| 
|-
| Dudle
| 
|
|-
| Duler 
| Bosansko Grahovo
| Canton 10
|-
| Dužani
| 
| 
|-
| Dužice 
| Široki Brijeg
|
|}

Lists of settlements in the Federation of Bosnia and Herzegovina (A-Ž)